is a railway station in the city of Nikkō, Tochigi, Japan, operated by the private railway operator Tōbu Railway. The station is numbered "TN-23".

Lines

Station layout
The station consists of two island platforms serving four tracks, connected to the station entrance by a footbridge.

Platforms

Adjacent stations

History
Shimo-Imaichi Station opened on 7 July 1929.

From 17 March 2012, station numbering was introduced on all Tōbu lines, with Shimo-Imaichi Station becoming "TN-23".

A turntable was installed next to the station in 2016 for turning the steam locomotive used on steam-hauled tourist trains operating between Shimo-Imaichi and  since August 2017. The turntable was acquired from the JR West Nagatoshi Station in Yamaguchi Prefecture. A two-stall engine shed to house the steam locomotive was also constructed adjacent to it. At the same time, the station was renovated to architecturally resemble a Japanese railway station from the Showa era.

The original footbridge linking the platforms received protection by the national government as a Registered Tangible Cultural Property in 2017.

Passenger statistics
In fiscal 2019, the station was used by an average of 2432 passengers daily (boarding passengers only).

Surrounding area
Former Imaichi City Hall
Imaichi Post Office

See also
 List of railway stations in Japan

References

External links

 Shimo-Imaichi Station information 

Railway stations in Tochigi Prefecture
Stations of Tobu Railway
Railway stations in Japan opened in 1929
Tobu Nikko Line
Tobu Kinugawa Line
Nikkō, Tochigi
Registered Tangible Cultural Properties